Clark v TDG Ltd (t/a Novacold Ltd) [1999] IRLR 318 is a UK labour law case concerning the Disability Discrimination Act 1995.

Facts
Mr Clark was injured at work (a frozen food warehouse in Hull). He was then dismissed when an orthopaedic doctor said he did not know when he would be able to start again.

Judgment
Mummery LJ said that the DDA drew no distinction between direct and indirect discrimination, and a justification defence is always available. The comparator was someone who was not disabled and could do the work. There certainly was discrimination, but on the question of justification, no attention had been paid to the Code of Practice.

Significance
Some of the comments in thiecase are no longer good law. Since Directive 2000/78/EC, there has been an amendment to the Disability Discrimination Act so that a distinction between direct and indirect discrimination was introduced, and the language of the Act clarified.

Lewisham LBC v Malcolm and EHRC [2008] UKHL 43, [2008] IRLR 700 expressly disapproved the decision though Baroness Hale dissented.

See also
UK employment discrimination law
UK labour law
Human Rights Act 1998

Notes

External links
TDG Novacold's address

United Kingdom labour case law
United Kingdom equality case law
Court of Appeal (England and Wales) cases
1999 in case law
1999 in British law